Omar Darío Cañas Espinosa (16 September 1969 – 3 February 1993) was a Colombian footballer who played as a midfielder. He competed in the men's tournament at the 1992 Summer Olympics.

Death
Cañas was assassinated on 3 February 1993, along with three other people.

References

1969 births
1993 deaths
Colombian footballers
Association football midfielders
Colombia international footballers
Olympic footballers of Colombia
Footballers at the 1992 Summer Olympics
Atlético Nacional footballers
Footballers from Medellín
Male murder victims
Colombian murder victims
People murdered in Colombia